The Edict of Cyrus is a 539 BCE proclamation by Achaemenid Empire founder Cyrus the Great attested by a cylinder seal of the time. The edict is mentioned in the Hebrew Bible, which claims that it authorized and encouraged the return of the exiled Judahites to the land of Judah and the rebuilding of the Temple in Jerusalem, although the Cyrus Cylinder does not refer directly to the inhabitants of Judah exiled by Nebuchadnezzar.

Biblical narrative
The edict of Cyrus appears in chapter 36 of Second Chronicles :

Ezra 1:1-4 reads:

The Book of Ezra says that the people of Cutha, known in Hebrew as "Cuthim" and described as the "adversaries" of the returning exiles, requested to join in the construction of the Second Temple, and when rebuffed by Zerubbabel and his companions, they composed a letter of complaint to Artaxerxes of Persia:

Rabbi Meïr Weiser advances the theory that the party of Mithredath Tabeel took advantage of the translation protocol contained in the document issued by Cyrus the Great's government. Essentially the protocol stated that each country in his kingdom was entitled to speak their unique language and pen texts to the king in their native tongue and have the presiding local officers of Artaxerxes of Persia translate the document.  Weiser continues that Mithredath Tabeel presented a substantial bribe to Rehum the secretary and Shimshai the scribe to have them compose a letter containing an ambiguity that could be interpreted as saying that the post-exile temple builders have varied the kings edict by actively engaging in the construction and fortification of the walls of Jerusalem in an attempt to rebel against the foreign king's rule. The ploy of Mithredath Tabeel and company was successful in leading to a 14-year cessation of all temple building activity in Jerusalem.

Following a second letter sent by the Persian governor asking the king for a decision, the Edict is found in the archives and the king gives his orders accordingly:

Historicity
The Cyrus Cylinder, an ancient clay cylinder inscribed with a declaration in the name of Cyrus referring to restoration of temples and repatriation of exiled peoples, has been taken by many scholars as corroboration of the authenticity of the biblical decrees attributed to Cyrus. Other scholars view the cylinder's text as specific to Babylon and Mesopotamia and highlight the absence of any mention of Judah or Jerusalem. Professor Lester L. Grabbe, while acknowledging a "general policy of allowing deportees to return and to re-establish cult sites", asserts that the "alleged decree of Cyrus permitting--even commanding--the Jews to rebuild the temple...cannot be considered authentic". He also characterizes the relevant archaeology as suggesting that the return was a "trickle" occurring over decades, rather than a single event.

References

Cyrus the Great
Edicts
Ezra–Nehemiah
Second Temple